The Ribeira River is a short river of Paraíba state in northeastern Brazil.

Course

The Ribeira River rises to the west of the PB-025 road from BR-101 to Lucena, and flows east.
It joins the Una River, which in turn is a tributary of the Paraíba River, to the north of the city of João Pessoa.

See also
List of rivers of Paraíba

References

Rivers of Paraíba